Fagel is a Dutch language surname. Notable people with the name include:
 François Nicolas Fagel (1655–1718), Dutch general
 Gaspar Fagel (1634–1688), Dutch politician, jurist, and diplomat
 Léon Fagel (1851–1913), French sculptor
 Rick Fagel (born 1953), American tennis player

References

Dutch-language surnames
Surnames from nicknames